Prosper Karangwa (born May 17, 1978) is a Rwandan former professional basketball player and front office executive for the Vice President of Player Personal Philadelphia 76ers of the National Basketball Association (NBA) with the duties of General Manager of Delaware Blue Coats of the NBA G League. Prior to his hire with Philadelphia, Karangwa worked with the Orlando Magic as Vice president of scouting. Before he joined the front office, Karangwa was a basketball player playing for teams like Basketball Löwen Braunschweig and Paris-Levallois. He retired in 2010.

After retiring, he joined the Orlando Magic as Vice President of College Scouting and before being promoted to Vice President of Scouting. In October 2020, he was hired by Elton Brand as Vice President of Player Personnel for the 76ers.

Basketball career

High school 
At 15, his interest in basketball became more serious. He started traveling to the U.S. for the AAU basketball competitions. His travels included weekly 10-plus hour Greyhound bus rides to face elite competition. One of the people he played with was his future boss Elton Brand. He gained interest from college scouts after.

College 
He played National Collegiate Athletic Association (NCAA) basketball at Siena College for four years (1999–2003).

Professional 
Karangwa played professional basketball for eight years overseas. The teams included  Basketball Löwen Braunschweig and Paris-Levallois. He retired in 2010.

Executive career

Scouting business 
He began attending games with Rob Jackson, a San Antonio Spurs scout and got him to take up scouting. He started his own scouting service to help European teams scout in the United States.

Orlando Magic 
In 2012, he was hired as a scout by the Orlando Magic. In 2016, he was promoted to Director of Scouting.

Philadelphia 76ers 
In October 2020, Karangwa was hired as Director of Player Personnel by Elton Brand for the Philadelphia 76ers.

Delaware Blue Coats 
In October 2021, Philadelphia 76ers named Karangwa, General Manager with his duties.

References 

1978 births
Living people
Basketball Löwen Braunschweig players
Besançon BCD players
Kapfenberg Bulls players
Metropolitans 92 players
National Basketball Association scouts
Rwandan men's basketball players
Siena Saints men's basketball players